Clay J. Cockerell is an American physician who works in the field of dermatology and dermatopathology. He is the founder and medical director of Cockerell Dermatopathology, a medical laboratory he operates in Dallas, Texas. He is also a clinical professor of dermatology and dermatopathology at the University of Texas Southwestern Medical Center where he also serves as the director of the dermatopathology division.

Early life and education

Cockerell grew up in Abilene, Texas attending Abilene Cooper High School before attending Texas Tech University and later Baylor College of Medicine in 1977. He graduated from Baylor with honors and completed his residency at New York University Medical Center, serving as chief resident. He also received training in pathology from Sloan-Kettering Memorial Hospital in New York.

Career

Medical career
Cockerell works in the field of dermatology and dermatopathology and has held and currently sits on multiple boards and committees. He was elected President of the American Academy of Dermatology in 2005, where he had been Secretary Treasurer. Cockerell served on the board of AmeriPath, Inc. prior to its acquisition by Quest Diagnostics. In the past he has served as Secretary-Treasurer of the Noah Worcester Dermatological Society and serves as director of the Zola Cooper-Lee Nesbitt Clinico-Pathologic Seminar.

Cockerell is the medical director of Cockerell Dermatopathology, a medical laboratory in Dallas, Texas.

He has written articles for medical and general publications.

Cockerell also serves as a clinical professor of dermatology and dermatopathology at the University of Texas Southwestern Medical Center where he has been the director of the dermatopathology division since 1992.

Bibliography

Cockerell has written over 750 original medical articles, posters, books, and papers.

Select publications

 Clinicopathological Correlations: Clay J. Cockerell, MD, Martin C. Mihm Jr., MD, Brian J. Hall, MD, Cary Chisholm, MD, Chad Jessup, MD, Margaret C. Merola, MD. Dermatopathology, First Edition 2013.
 Id-Like Reaction to BCC Therapy for Bladder Cancer. Christopher Lowther, MD, John D. Miedler, MD, Clay J. Cockerell, MD Cutis, Volume 91 No. 3, March 2013.
 Mitotic Rate in Cutaneous Melanomas 1 mm in Thickness: A Prospective Study, Brandon R. Litzner, MD, Chukwuemeka N. Etufugh, MD, Shelly Stepenaskie, MD, Linda S. Hynan, PhD and Clay J. Cockerell, MD, The American Journal of Dermatopathology, Volume 34, Number 8, December 2012.
 Cutaneous Manifestations of HIV Disease, Clay J. Cockerell, Antoanella Calame, Manson Publishing Ltd, United Kingdom, 2012.
 Diagnostic Pathology Nonneoplastic Dermatopathology, John C. Hall, MD, Brian J. Hall, MD, Clay J Cockerell, MD, First Edition, 2012
 Impact of guidance from a computer-aided multispectral digital skin lesion analysis device on decision to biopsy lesions clinically suggestive of melanoma, Rigel DS, Roy M, Yoo J, Cockerell CJ, Robinson JK, White R., Arch Dermatol. 2012 Apr; 148(4):541-3. Feb 2012.

Personal life

Cockerell is a third-generation dermatologist and fourth-generation physician originally from Abilene, Texas. He, as well as his late father, Earl Grafton Cockerell, his grandfather, Earl Rush Cockerell, and great-grandfather, Lonnie L. Cockerell all received their medical training at Baylor College of Medicine.  He is married to his high school sweetheart, Brenda, also a native Texan and they wed in 1977. They have two children, Charles West Cockerell and Lillian Allene Cockerell.

References

External links
 Cockerell Dermatopathology

American dermatologists
University of Texas Southwestern Medical Center faculty
Texas Tech University alumni
Baylor College of Medicine alumni
Living people
People from Abilene, Texas
Year of birth missing (living people)